Progress M1-11, identified by NASA as Progress 13P, was a Progress spacecraft used to resupply the International Space Station. It was a Progress-M1 11F615A55 spacecraft, with the serial number 260.

Launch
Progress M1-11 was launched by a Soyuz-U carrier rocket from Site 1/5 at the Baikonur Cosmodrome. Launch occurred at 11:58:08 UTC on 29 January 2004.

Docking
The spacecraft docked with the aft port of the Zvezda module at 13:13:11 UTC on 31 January 2004. It remained docked for 114 days before undocking at 09:19:29 UTC on 24 May 2004 to make way for Progress M-49. Following undocking, it remained in orbit for ten days, conducting tests of its attitude control system. It was deorbited at 09:50 UTC on 3 June 2004. The spacecraft burned up in the atmosphere over the Pacific Ocean, with any remaining debris landing in the ocean at around 10:36:25 UTC.

Progress M1-11 carried supplies to the International Space Station, including food, water and oxygen for the crew and equipment for conducting scientific research. Its cargo included an Orlan spacesuit, a replacement flex hose for the Destiny module, a new Elektron oxygen generator with spare parts for the Elektron already aboard the ISS, some oxygen generator candles, spare batteries, new fire detection and suppression systems, a gas analysis system, cameras, data cassettes, and an external experiment package for the Zvezda module, Matreshka. It was also used to perform a reboost manoeuvre shortly before its departure from the ISS.

It was the last Progress-M1 11F615A55 to be launched, with all subsequent flights until 2011 using the earlier Progress-M spacecraft. An updated Progress M1, serial number 11F615A70, was later canceled. Progress-M was eventually replaced by 11F615A60, which retained the Progress-M designation, beginning with Progress M-01M in 2008.

See also
 List of Progress flights
 Uncrewed spaceflights to the International Space Station

References

Spacecraft launched in 2004
Progress (spacecraft) missions
Supply vehicles for the International Space Station
Spacecraft launched by Soyuz-U rockets
Spacecraft which reentered in 2004